The 1981–82 Czechoslovak First League was contested by 16 teams, and Dukla Prague won the championship. Peter Herda and Ladislav Vízek were the league's top scorers with 15 goals each.

Stadia and locations

League standings

Results

Top goalscorers

References

Czechoslovakia - List of final tables (RSSSF)

Czechoslovak First League seasons
Czech
1981–82 in Czechoslovak football